Martin Secker (6 April 1882 – 6 April 1978), born Percy Martin Secker Klingender, was a London publisher who was responsible for producing the work of a distinguished group of literary authors, including D. H. Lawrence, Thomas Mann, Norman Douglas, Henry James, Compton Mackenzie, and George Orwell. He began publishing just before the First World War.
Secker lived at Bridgefoot House, Iver, Buckinghamshire.
 
In 1935, Secker's original firm merged to form the new company of Secker & Warburg.

References

External links
John Trevitt, "Secker, Martin (1882–1978)", Oxford Dictionary of National Biography, Oxford University Press, 2004, accessed 11 Jan 2008

1882 births
1978 deaths
Publishers (people) from London
People from Buckinghamshire
20th-century English businesspeople